Nathan "Nat" Douglas Silcock (25 November 1927 – 7 July 1992) was an English professional rugby league footballer who played in the 1940s, 1950s and 1960s, and coached in the 1960s.

Background
Nat Silcock was born in Widnes, Lancashire, England, he was the son of the rugby league footballer; Nat Silcock Sr., and he died aged 64 in Penketh, Lancashire, England.

Playing career

England

Wigan
Silcock played  in Wigan's 16-11 victory over Australia at Central Park, Wigan on Wednesday 20 October 1948. Silcock played  in Wigan's 14-8 victory over Warrington in the 1948–49 Lancashire County Cup Final during the 1948–49 season at Station Road, Swinton on Saturday 13 November 1948. Silcock played , and scored a try in Wigan's 20-2 victory over Huddersfield in the Championship Final during the 1949–50 season at Maine Road, Manchester on Saturday 13 May 1950.

Silcock played , and scored 3-tries in the 49-28 victory over Italy at Central Park, Wigan on Saturday 26 August 1950. He played right-, i.e. number 12, in the 28-5 victory over Warrington in the 1950–51 Lancashire County Cup Final during the 1950–51 season at Station Road, Swinton on Saturday 4 November 1950. Silcock played in Wigan's victories in the Lancashire County League during the 1949–50 season and 1951–52 season. Silcock played left-, i.e. number 11, in Wigan's 10-0 victory over Barrow in the 1950–51 Challenge Cup Final during the 1950–51 season at Wembley Stadium, London on Saturday 5 May 1951. He played  in the 14-6 victory over Leigh in the 1951–52 Lancashire County Cup Final during the 1951–52 season at Station Road, Swinton on Saturday 27 October 1951. Silcock was also selected to play for England in 1951 against Other Nationalities. He also played , and scored a try in the 13-6 victory over Bradford Northern in the Championship Final during the 1951–52 season at Leeds Road, Huddersfield on Saturday 10 May 1952. Silcock was selected to play for England in 1952 against Other Nationalities.

Silcock was selected to play for England while in 1953 against Wales. Silcock played right-, i.e. number 10, in Wigan's 8-16 defeat by St. Helens in the 1953–54 Lancashire County Cup Final during the 1953–54 season at Station Road, Swinton on Saturday 24 October 1953. He also won caps for Great Britain in 1954 against Australia (3 matches).

St Helens
Silcock played right-, i.e. number 10, in St. Helens' 13-2 victory over Halifax in the 1956 Challenge Cup Final during the 1955–56 season at Wembley Stadium, London on Saturday 28 April 1956, in front of a crowd of 79,341, and played right- in the 3-10 defeat by Oldham in the 1956–57 Lancashire County Cup Final during the 1956–57 season at Central Park, Wigan on Saturday 20 October 1956, in front of a crowd of 39,544.

Warrington
Silcock played for Warrington from September 1958 to April 1961. Silcock played  in Warrington's 5-4 victory over St. Helens in the 1959–60 Lancashire County Cup Final during the 1959–60 season at Central Park, Wigan on Saturday 31 October 1959, in front of a crowd of 39,237.

Australia

Newcastle
Silcock travelled to Australia to play in the Newcastle Rugby League for the South Newcastle club from 1961 to 1964. In 2010 Silcock was named in a South Newcastle team of the century.

Sydney
Silcock moved to Sydney's New South Wales Rugby Football League to captain-coach Eastern Suburbs club for the 1964 NSWRFL Premiership season.

Genealogical information
Nat Silcock's marriage to Zelma P. (née Roocroft) was registered during third ¼ 1952 in Prescot district. They had children; Sandra P. Silcock (birth registered second ¼  in Prescot district) and Karl N. D. Silcock 1966

References

External links
Statistics at wigan.rlfans.com
Profile at saints.org.uk
Statistics at wolvesplayers.thisiswarrington.co.uk

1927 births
1992 deaths
England national rugby league team players
English rugby league coaches
English rugby league players
Great Britain national rugby league team players
Lancashire rugby league team players
Newcastle rugby league team players
Rugby league players from Widnes
Rugby league props
Rugby league second-rows
Rugby league wingers
Rugby League XIII players
South Newcastle Lions players
St Helens R.F.C. players
Sydney Roosters coaches
Sydney Roosters players
Sydney Roosters captains
Warrington Wolves players
Wigan Warriors players